Thought and World: An Austere Portrayal of Truth, Reference, and Semantic Correspondence is a 2002 book by Christopher S. Hill in which he presents a theory of the content of semantic notions that are applied to thoughts.

Reception
The book has been reviewed by Keith Simmons, Anil Gupta and Marian David.

References

External links 
 Thought and World

2002 non-fiction books
Cambridge University Press books
Books about consciousness
Philosophy of mind literature